Smallridge is a large hamlet in All Saints parish in the East Devon district of Devon, England. The hamlet is situated about 1 mile north of the town of Axminster.  It is close to the A358 road, and is within the Blackdown Hills Area of Outstanding Natural Beauty.

It used to have a village pub, however this is now a 'country hotel' restaurant, The Ridgeway Inn.

External links

Villages in Devon